Scartella springeri (Springer's blenny) is a species of combtooth blenny found in the eastern Atlantic Ocean, around St. Helena.  This species reaches a length of  SL. The specific name honours the American ichthyologist Victor G. Springer of the U.S. National Museum.

References

springeri
Fish described in 1967